Jorge Díaz (born 26 November 1985) is a Spanish sports shooter. He competed in the men's 10 metre air rifle event at the 2016 Summer Olympics.

References

External links
 

1985 births
Living people
Spanish male sport shooters
Olympic shooters of Spain
Place of birth missing (living people)
Shooters at the 2016 Summer Olympics
Mediterranean Games silver medalists for Spain
Mediterranean Games medalists in shooting
Competitors at the 2018 Mediterranean Games
European Games competitors for Spain
Shooters at the 2015 European Games
21st-century Spanish people